Tsugaru (津軽) may refer to:
 Tsugaru, Aomori, a city of Aomori Prefecture, Japan
 Tsugaru Peninsula
 Tsugaru Strait, between Honshū and Hokkaidō
 Tsugaru Kaikyō Ferry, a ferry crossing this strait
 Tsugaru-jamisen, a traditional style of shamisen playing associated with the area
 Tsugaru dialect, a dialect of Japanese spoken in this area
 Tsugaru clan, a daimyō clan
 Tsugaru (novel), by Osamu Dazai
 Tsugaru Expressway, an expressway in Aomori Prefecture, Japan
 Tsugaru (train), a train service in Japan
 Japanese cruiser Tsugaru (formerly the Imperial Russian Pallada), a warship in the Imperial Japanese Navy
 Japanese minelayer Tsugaru, a minelayer that took part in the Pacific War
 "Tsugaru", a song from the Dance Dance Revolution series
 Tsugaru Mine, an extensive coal mine in Kobyaysky Ulus, Sakha Republic, Siberia
 Tsugaru (apple), a variety of Japanese apple